Hillarys Boat Harbour is a marina and tourist precinct located in Hillarys, north of Perth, Western Australia and on the Indian Ocean.

History
Hillarys Boat Harbour was the first such major marina in the north metropolitan region of Perth. Construction of the new Harbour commenced in September 1985. Protestors lay down in front of bulldozers to halt early site works. Boat launching facilities were completed in October 1986 and boats started moving into pen moorings two months later, just before the start of the 1987 America's Cup Challenge Series.

In 1989 receivers were appointed to sell the assets of the Lombardo Group and Sorento Quay was sold to the Japanese group Victoria Co. The Wyllie Group bought Sorrento Quay, the retail precinct at Hillarys Boat Harbour in 1999 for $16 million from Victoria Co.

A  footbridge with a drawbridge, would cross the harbour from the new area to the northern parking area.

The WA Planning Commission approved the now $12 million project in 2005 and the Wyllie Group lodged an application for a building licence in November of the same year.

In May 2006, the WA Department of Planning and Infrastructure committed $5 million to expand the area they managed at the boat harbour with boardwalks, upgrades to picnic areas, new barbecue facilities, toilets, improved lightning, trees, grass and shade structures with work to begin in August of that year.

The new development cost $30 million when it was opened by MLA Rob Johnson on 13 December 2008. The new Breakwater Tavern had been fitted out at $7 million by the Reid family. A further 19 marine pens had been constructed and a new Rottnest Island ferry terminal. Another stage was planned with the redevelopment of the old tavern and adding of more shops and food and beverage facilities.

Attractions
Hillarys is also home to Aquarium of Western Australia (AQWA) which showcases the marine life and unique regions of Western Australia's  coastline. AQWA is open daily from 10am to 5pm. Other attractions in and around the harbour include helicopter flights, fishing charters and cruises. A ferry also departs from here to Rottnest Island daily.

In 1995, an amusement park named The Great Escape opened on the eastern side of the harbour, adjacent to the beach. The complex included three water slides, trampolines, dry attractions and a mini-golf course called "Wacky Putt". In June 2016, the park closed after its tenancy lease wasn't renewed, but briefly reopened with the dry attractions, trampolines and Wacky Putt operating in Summer 2016. The park was eventually demolished in November 2017 after standing idle for nine months.

On 12 September 2018, after leaseholder Wyllie Group struck a deal with local family company, Pirate's Cove Adventure Golf, plans emerged of a complex in the former Great Escape site that would include two themed 18-hole golf courses, a double flowrider, a cafe, a small bar and a beach kiosk, with completion scheduled in March 2019. However the next month, the project was suddenly cancelled following negative publicity surrounding a shareholder of Pirate's Cove Adventure Golf and his previous business relationship with notorious child rapist William Goad.

See also
Little Island

References

External links
 
 WA Department of Transport - boating facilities
 Sorrento Quay Boardwalk

Tourist attractions in Perth, Western Australia
Marinas in Australia